Collapsed View is the ninth studio album by Bugskull, released on August 26, 2014 by Digitalis Recordings.

Track listing

Personnel 
Adapted from the Collapsed View liner notes.
 Sean Byrne – lead vocals, instruments

Release history

References 

2014 albums
Bugskull albums